Ross Case and Geoff Masters were the defending champions and second seeds, but they lost to unseeded West Germans Harald Elschenbroich and Rolf Gehring in the first round.

In an all-Australian final on home soil (for the fourth year in a row), the third seeds John Alexander and Phil Dent defeated the fifth seeds Bob Carmichael and Allan Stone to win the title, 6–3, 7–6. This was Alexander's first Grand Slam title (he would later win the 1982 Australian Open with John Fitzgerald) and Dent's first and only Grand Slam title.

Seeds

Draw

Finals

Top half

Bottom half

External links
 1976 Australian Open – Men's draws and results at the International Tennis Federation

Men's Doubles
Australian Open (tennis) by year – Men's doubles